This is a list of aircraft used by the Spanish Nationalist faction in the Spanish Civil War. The aircraft were mainly received from aid from Fascist Italy and Nazi Germany. Aircraft are in chronological order of adoption by the Spanish Nationalist airforce.

Fighters 

 Heinkel He 51
 Fiat CR.32
 Heinkel He 112

Bombers 

 Junkers Ju 52
 Junkers Ju 86
 Fiat BR.20 Cicogna
 Heinkel He 111

Maritime 

 CANT Z.501 Gabbiano
 CANT Z.506 Airone

References 

Nationalist Spain in the Spanish Civil War
aircraft